Mesopotamia is a narrow ait (about 800 yards by 30 yards) that forms part of the University Parks in Oxford, England. It lies between the upper and lower levels of the River Cherwell which are partly interspersed with the Thames. The name Mesopotamia in Greek means "between the rivers", and is shared with an area between the Tigris and Euphrates rivers in present-day Iraq.

The land was purchased by the University of Oxford during the expansion of the Oxford University Parks between 1860 and 1865. A footpath, Mesopotamia Walk, laid out in 1865 runs along the centre of the spur to Kings Mill.

The Domesday Book records a watermill on this site and milling continued until 1825; one level of the river was once the mill stream. From 1914, attempts were made to introduce wild ducks and geese to the area, which proved fruitless due to a predatory otter population. Until 1926, a ferry operated from a point halfway along the Walk, when it was replaced by a footbridge.

Position:

See also
 Addison's Walk
 Parson's Pleasure
 Dame's Delight

References

1865 establishments in England
Footpaths in Oxford
University of Oxford sites
Parks and open spaces in Oxford
Islands of the River Thames